Baba Kandi (also Romanized as Bābā Kandī; also known as Bābā Kandī Kūh) is a village in Kuhsar Rural District, in the Central District of Hashtrud County, East Azerbaijan Province, Iran. At the 2006 census, its population was 196, in 38 families.

References 

Towns and villages in Hashtrud County